The fourth Women's Hockey Olympic Qualifier was held at National Hockey Stadium in Milton Keynes, England, from 23 March until 2 April 2000. Ten nations took part and played a round robin. The top five teams joined hosts and defending champions Australia (also Oceania Cup winner), Argentina (Pan American Games winner), South Korea (Asian Games winner), the Netherlands (European Nations Cup winner) and South Africa (All-Africa Games winner).

Officials
The following umpires were appointed by the International Hockey Federation to officiate the tournament:

 Michelle Arnold (AUS)
 Jean Buchanan (RSA)
 Renée Chatas (USA)
 Gillian Clarke (GBR)
 Renée Cohen (NED)
 Ute Conen (GER)
 Lyn Farrell (NZL)
 Angela Larío (ESP)
 Gina Spitaleri (ITA)
 Kazuko Yasueda (JPN)

Team rosters

( 1.) Julia Zwehl (gk), (2.) Birgit Beyer (gk), (3.) Denise Klecker, (4.) Tanja Dickenscheid, (5.) Nadine Ernsting-Krienke, (6.) Inga Möller, (7.) Natascha Keller, (8.) Melanie Cremer, (9.) Friederike Barth, (11.) Cornelia Reiter, (12.) Britta Becker, (13.) Marion Rodewald, (15.) Heike Lätzsch, (16.) Katrin Kauschke (c), (22.) Simone Grässer, (24.) Fanny Rinne, (25.) Caroline Casaretto, and (32.) Franziska Gude. Head Coach: Berti Rauth.

( 1.) Carolyn Reid (gk), ( 2.) Hilary Rose (gk), ( 3.) Kristy Bowden, ( 4.) Jane Smith, ( 5.) Sue Chandler (c), ( 6.) Melanie Clewlow, ( 7.) Tina Cullen, ( 8.) Kathryn Johnson, (9.) Mandy Nicholson, (10.) Jane Sixsmith, (11.) Purdy Miller, (12.) Denise Marston-Smith, (13.) Helen Richardson, (14.) Fiona Greenham, (15.) Janet Jack, (16.) Kate Walsh, (17.) Sarah Blanks, and (18.) Lucilla Wright. Head Coach: Jon Royce.

(1.) Skippy McGregor, (2.) Moira Senior, (3.) Kylie Foy, (4.) Sandy Bennett, (5.) Rachel Sutherland, (6.) Rachel Petrie, (7.) Anna Lawrence (c), (8.) Robyn Matthews, (10.) Kate Trolove, (12.) Mandy Smith, (13.) Lisa Walton, (14.) Suzie Pearce, (15.) Anne-Marie Irving (gk), (16.) Helen Clarke (gk), (17.) Caryn Paewai, (18.) Diana Weavers, and (31.) Tina Bell-Kake, Head Coach: Jan Borren.

Tingonleima Chanu (gk and (c)), Helen Mary (gk), Amandeep Kaur, Marystella Tirkey, Kanti Baa, Sunita Dalal, Suraj Lata Devi, Sumrai Tete, Neha Singh, Kamala Dalal, Jyoti Sunita Kullu, Ferdina Ekka, Mamta Kharab, Surinder Kaur, Ngasepam Pakpi Devi, and Manorama Goswami. Head Coach: Gurdial Singh Banghu.

Kate Barber, Margaret Storrar (gk), Tracey Fuchs (c), Kelli James, Chris DeBow, Kris Fillat, Kristen Holmes, Katie Kauffman, Antoinette Lucas, Eleanor Race, Jill Reeve, Cindy Werley, Jana Toepel, Michelle Vizzuso, Tracey Larson, Tara Jelley, and Nancy Pelligreen. Head Coach: Tracey Belbin.

Results

Preliminary round

Group A

Pool B

Classification round

Ninth and tenth place

Fifth to eighth place classification

Crossover

Seventh and eighth place

Fifth and sixth place

First to fourth place classification

Semi-finals

Third and fourth place

Final

Final ranking

Remarks
 The first five (New Zealand, Great Britain, Germany, Spain and China) qualified for the 2000 Summer Olympics in Sydney.

Top scorers

References
 Overview on FIH-site
 US Field Hockey
 Results
 Hockey Sport, April 2000, Issue 204

Olympics
 Women
2000W
2000 in women's field hockey
2000 in English women's sport
March 2000 sports events in the United Kingdom
April 2000 sports events in the United Kingdom
Sport in Milton Keynes
Qual
2000s in Buckinghamshire